The East Sierra League is a high school athletic league that is part of the CIF Central Section.

Members
 Kings Christian High School
 Laton High School
 Wonderful Academy High School
 Alpaugh High School
 Riverdale Christian High School

References

CIF Central Section